The 1994 East Carolina Pirates football team was an American football team that represented East Carolina University as an independent during the 1994 NCAA Division I-A football season. In their third season under head coach Steve Logan, the team compiled a 7–5 record.

Schedule

References

East Carolina
East Carolina Pirates football seasons
East Carolina Pirates football